In logic, mathematics and computer science, especially metalogic and computability theory, an effective method or effective procedure is a procedure for solving a problem by any intuitively 'effective' means from a specific class. An effective method is sometimes also called a mechanical method or procedure.

Definition
The definition of an effective method involves more than the method itself. In order for a method to be called effective, it must be considered with respect to a class of problems. Because of this, one method may be effective with respect to one class of problems and not be effective with respect to a different class.

A method is formally called effective for a class of problems when it satisfies these criteria:
 It consists of a finite number of exact, finite instructions.
 When it is applied to a problem from its class:
 It always finishes (terminates) after a finite number of steps.
 It always produces a correct answer.
 In principle, it can be done by a human without any aids except writing materials.
 Its instructions need only to be followed rigorously to succeed. In other words, it requires no ingenuity to succeed.

Optionally, it may also be required that the method never returns a result as if it were an answer when the method is applied to a problem from outside its class. Adding this requirement reduces the set of classes for which there is an effective method.

Algorithms
An effective method for calculating the values of a function is an algorithm. Functions for which an effective method exists are sometimes called effectively calculable.

Computable functions
Several independent efforts to give a formal characterization of effective calculability led to a variety of proposed definitions (general recursive functions, Turing machines, λ-calculus) that later were shown to be equivalent. The notion captured by these definitions is known as recursive or effective computability.

The Church–Turing thesis states that the two notions coincide: any number-theoretic function that is effectively calculable is recursively computable. As this is not a mathematical statement, it cannot be proven by a mathematical proof.

See also
Decidability (logic)
Decision problem
Function problem
Effective results in number theory
Recursive set
Undecidable problem

References 

 S. C. Kleene (1967), Mathematical logic. Reprinted, Dover, 2002, pp. 233 ff., esp. p. 231.

Metalogic
Computability theory
Theory of computation